Analia Araceli Yaryes Estaque (born 9 August 1993) is a Paraguayan team handball goalkeeper for Club Cerro Porteño and the Paraguay national team.

She represented Paraguay at the 2013 World Women's Handball Championship in Serbia, where the Paraguayan team placed 21st.

References

Paraguayan female handball players
1993 births
Living people
20th-century Paraguayan women
21st-century Paraguayan women